Ann Finkbeiner is a science writer who has contributed to various publications including Scientific American, Nature, Science, Hakai Magazine, Quanta Magazine, Discover, Sky & Telescope, and Astronomy.

Finkbeiner test

The Finkbeiner test is named after her.  The test is a checklist to help science journalists avoid gender bias in articles about women in science. Finkbeiner is an English major, and for 20 years taught and directed a graduate science-writing program at Johns Hopkins University in Baltimore, Maryland.

Career
Finkbeiner has written columns for USA Today and Defense Technology International (now defunct) and her book reviews have appeared in The Wall Street Journal, The New York Times, and Nature.

Finkbeiner is a co-proprietor of the science blog The Last Word on Nothing.

Books
 A Grand and Bold Thing.

 The Jasons.

 After the Death of a Child.

Articles
 Ann Finkbeiner, "Orbital Aggression: How do we prevent war in space?", Scientific American, vol. 323, no. 5 (November 2020), pp. 50–57.

References

External links 
 Profile of Physics Nobel Laureate Andrea Ghez in Nature
 The Last Word on Nothing
 Ann Finkbeiner profile
 

Living people
Science journalists
American science writers
Johns Hopkins University faculty
Science bloggers
American women bloggers
American bloggers
Sky & Telescope people
Women science writers
American women non-fiction writers
21st-century American non-fiction writers
Year of birth missing (living people)
American women academics
21st-century American women writers